Sin of a Beautiful Woman is a 1929 Czech silent drama film directed by Karel Lamač and starring Josef Rovenský, Marcella Albani and Gaston Jacquet. It was shot in Kavalírka studio in Prague.

Cast
 Josef Rovenský as Actor Ivan Kristen  
 Marcella Albani as Actress Soňa Kristenová  
 Gaston Jacquet as Eduard Warren  
 Walter Rilla as Actor Richard Kent  
 Ladislav H. Struna as Thief Ferda Štika  
 Karel Schleichert as Old Taverner  
 Alois Charvát as Director of Provincial Theatre  
 Josef Šváb-Malostranský as Provincial Actor  
 Ludvík Veverka as Warren's Assistant  
 Bronislava Livia as Mimi Stevensová  
 Bohumil Kovář as Director  
 Jiří Červený as Intendant of the Great Theatre  
 Čeněk Šlégl as Warren's Secretary 
 Betty Kysilková as Prompter  
 Theodor Pištěk as Police Commissioner  
 Ernst Waldow as Examining Officer

Release
In 2017 the film was restored by Czech Film Archive. New electronic music was created by Johana Ožvold, Martin Ožvold and Jan Kratochvíl.

References

External links

1929 films
Czech silent films
Films directed by Karel Lamač
Czech black-and-white films
Czech drama films
1929 drama films
Silent drama films
1920s Czech-language films